The canton of Octeville-sur-Mer is an administrative division of the Seine-Maritime department, in northern France. It was created at the French canton reorganisation which came into effect in March 2015. Its seat is in Octeville-sur-Mer.

It consists of the following communes:

Angerville-l'Orcher 
Anglesqueville-l'Esneval
Beaurepaire
Bénouville
Bordeaux-Saint-Clair
Cauville-sur-Mer
Criquetot-l'Esneval
Cuverville
Épouville
Étretat
Fongueusemare
Fontaine-la-Mallet
Fontenay
Gonneville-la-Mallet
Hermeville
Heuqueville
Manéglise
Mannevillette
Notre-Dame-du-Bec
Octeville-sur-Mer
Pierrefiques
La Poterie-Cap-d'Antifer
Rolleville
Sainte-Marie-au-Bosc
Saint-Jouin-Bruneval
Saint-Martin-du-Bec
Saint-Martin-du-Manoir 
Le Tilleul
Turretot
Vergetot
Villainville

References

Cantons of Seine-Maritime